Pseudophoenix is a genus of palms which is native to the wider Caribbean.  Three species of the four species are endemic to Hispaniola, while the fourth, P. sargentii, is widely distributed in the northern Caribbean (Greater Antilles, Windward Islands, Bahamas), Florida, and the Yucatán Peninsula (Belize and southeastern Mexico).

Trees in this genus are medium to large palms with single, unclustered trunks.  They lack spines and have pinnately compound leaves.  Flowers are green and bisexual; the ripe fruit are red.

Species

References

 
Arecaceae genera
Trees of the Caribbean
Neotropical realm flora